Eli Schenkel (born September 11, 1992) is a Canadian foil fencer. Schenkel has represented the country on the international stage since 2013, and has competed at two Pan American Games and four World Fencing Championships. Schenkel also runs a fencing school in Richmond, British Columbia.

Career 
At the 2019 Pan American Games, Schenkel won two team medals.

Olympics
Schenkel represented Canada at the 2020 Summer Olympics.

Personal
Schenkel has a MSc in Management from Durham University.

References

External links
 

1992 births
Canadian male fencers
Living people
Fencers at the 2015 Pan American Games
Fencers at the 2019 Pan American Games
Pan American Games silver medalists for Canada
Pan American Games bronze medalists for Canada
Pan American Games medalists in fencing
Medalists at the 2019 Pan American Games
Fencers at the 2020 Summer Olympics
Olympic fencers of Canada
Alumni of Durham University